The 1987 Summer Universiade, also known as the XIV Summer Universiade, took place in Zagreb, SR Croatia, SFR Yugoslavia. It involved participants from 111 countries and over 6,000 individual sportspersons and members of teams.

Infrastructural changes

The city of Zagreb used the event to renovate and revitalize the city. The city's main square (Republic Square) was repaved with stone blocks and made part of the downtown pedestrian zone. A part of the Medveščak stream, which had been running under the sewers since 1898, was uncovered by workers. This part formed the Manduševac fountain that was also covered in 1898.

Mascot
The mascot of the 1987 Summer Universiade is a squirrel, named "Zagi" and created by Nedjeljko Dragić. It is a resident of Zagreb's parks, amiable and always in a good mood. Its nonchalance and gaiety are but a cover for diligence. Always on the move and reaching for the seemingly impossible, the squirrel embodies the dynamism of athletic endeavour. Its origin is shown by the little black hat, characteristic of the folk costumes in the region of Zagreb.

Sports

Medal table

See also
 European Universities Games 2016
 European University Sports Association
 FISU

References

External links
 ZAGREB WELCOMES THE XIVMER UNIVERSIADE by VAN MECANOVIC PRESIDENT OF THE YUGOSLAVIAN OLYMPIC COMMITTEE 
 Univerzijada ‘87. – drugi ilirski preporod
 U Beogradu nisu htjeli da Dražen otvori Univerzijadu 

 
Summer World University Games
Universiade
Universiade
Universiade
Summer Universiade, 1987
Summer Universiade, 1987
Universiade
Multi-sport events in Yugoslavia
1980s in Zagreb
July 1987 sports events in Europe